Jonathan Marray (born 10 March 1981) is a former British tennis player and a Wimbledon Men's Doubles champion. Marray is a former top 20 doubles player, reaching a career high of world no. 15 in January 2013, mainly due to more regular appearances on the ATP World Tour, following his victory at Wimbledon 2012. He has also competed on the singles tour, reaching world no. 215 in April 2005, but was unable to continue his singles career, in part due to injuries.

Marray first came to prominence at the 2004 Queen's Club Championship where he reached the third round. Marray has since played predominantly on the ATP Challenger Tour, where he has reached one singles final and won multiple doubles competitions.

In 2012 at Wimbledon, he and his doubles partner, Frederik Nielsen, on a wildcard entry into the tournament, won the final in five sets, beating the much favoured fifth seeds, Robert Lindstedt and Horia Tecău. Marray was the first British men's doubles champion since Raymond Tuckey and Pat Hughes in 1936, the same year that Fred Perry last won the Wimbledon singles title. Marray and Nielsen also became the first players to win the men's doubles event on a wildcard.

Marray made his Davis Cup debut at 32, playing with Colin Fleming in the 2013 tie against Russia. Great Britain came from 2–0 down to beat Russia 3–2 to earn a World Group play-off. The last time Great Britain had come from 2–0 down to win a tie was 83 years previously against Germany. Marray was named for the 2013 World Group play-off against Croatia and so helped Great Britain earn promotion to the World Group for the first time since 2008.

Early and personal life
Marray was born in Fazakerley, Liverpool, his father Kevin worked in computing at the Midland Bank, now HSBC, and his mother Kathleen was a nurse. Because of his father's job, they moved to Sheffield when Marray was three years old.

Marray attended Catholic primary school St Wilfrid's. Marray didn't start playing tennis until he was 10, when his mother took the family to a local club, Abbeydale Tennis Club, after watching Wimbledon.
Marray was educated at All Saints Catholic High School, a Voluntary Aided Roman Catholic state secondary school, and played on the school's tennis courts Marray played tennis with his brother David at Hallamshire Tennis and Squash Club, and at the HSBC courts in Dore, Sheffield. Two years older, David held the upper hand on the tennis court until Jonny was 14

After A-levels, he decided against university and turned professional in 2000. Most British professionals are nurtured from childhood as part of the Lawn Tennis Association's elite. Marray had not competed in junior grand slam tournaments and didn't have a junior world ranking, but he was determined to give it a go.

Marray has been confused for Andy Murray, especially when Andy first came on to the scene. While playing in Challenger tournaments in the US, people were asking, ‘are you the new kid, the next big thing?’. “Although I had to tell them I wasn't, every time I say Marray, they say Murray.” 

Marray shared a house in Sheffield with his sister, Siobhan, which he bought with his brother, David

Career

2000
In February, Marray made his doubles debut at the Hull Challenger with Ben Gudzelak where they reached the quarterfinal. Marray/Gudzelak played five more tournaments in 2000.

Marray played his first singles match at the Dublin Futures F2 in June, losing in the first round.
At his second tournament in November, Marray won the India F4 Futures in Lucknow.

2001–2006
Marray partnered Ben Riby and James May in the first half of 2001, then David Sherwood from July 2001 to June 2003;Marray/Sherwood winning five Futures titles during this period. Marray's first grand slam was the 2002 Wimbledon Championships with David Sherwood, losing in the 1st round.

From July 2003. Marray began a long-term partnership with Mark Hilton that lasted till the end of 2005, though it was not exclusive.

In early 2004, Marray won the British Satellite event in singles at Sheffield, while Marray/Hilton won four doubles tournaments on the satellite tour and consequently, Marray was announced for his Davis Cup debut in the Europe/Africa Zone Group I tie against Luxembourg. However he missed out when his teammates Tim Henman, Greg Rusedski and Arvind Parmar all played; Great Britain winning 4–1.

He first hit the headlines, when he reached the third round of the 2004 Queen's Club Singles, getting his first wins on the ATP Tour. In the third round he lost to the sixth seed Lleyton Hewitt, 7–6(2), 7–6 (8), wasting seven set points over two sets (respectively six and one), Hewitt needed five match points to finish the contest. This earned him his first singles appearance at Wimbledon as a wild card, although he was defeated in the first round by Karol Beck.

At this time, Marray was seen as a possible successor to Tim Henman, having a natural serve/volley game.

In September 2004, Marray/Sherwood won their sixth and final Futures title, Mulhouse France F14.

In January 2005 he won his first Challenger doubles tournament in Wrexham, with Mark Hilton He reached his highest singles ranking of 215 in May 2005.

In 2006, Marray mainly partnered Martin Lee, but played with eleven other players, winning 3 Challengers and a Futures tournament.

From May 2004 to June 2006, he stayed in the top 300 of the singles ranking for all but one week, but despite this consistency, did not progress any further. He reached a then-high of 138 in the doubles in August 2005. He did manage to make a final in singles of an ATP Challenger event, at the Nottingham Challenger event where he lost in straight sets to Robin Vik 3–6, 2–6.

2007–2008
At Wimbledon 2007, partnering Richard Bloomfield, he made the third round, losing to the top seeded Bryan brothers. This was his best Grand Slam performance until 2012. His doubles ranking was a lot higher than in singles, so he took the opportunity to play better tournaments in doubles than singles. He continued to compete on the Challenger tour, although he eventually stopped playing singles matches.
Following the Championships, Marray was injured and after shoulder surgery, he struggled to find form and confidence, and considered quitting. Marray didn't play again until Wimbledon 2008 where he and Alex Bogdanovic were beaten in the first round. At his next tournament, Marray and Frederik Nielsen reached the finals of the Dublin Challenger.

In December 2008, Marray partnered Colin Fleming whose regular partner Ken Skupski was resting, and played in the Czech Republic, winning two Futures in  Frydland Nad Ostravici, and Opava

2009
In January, Marray and Richard Bloomfield won the Sheffield Futures.

Marray teamed up with fourteen players this year, but his lack of success meant he came close to giving up numerous times and becoming a coach. In 2009, things reached their nadir, but it proved to be a breakthrough season. Marray said "I played in a qualifying match in Nottingham just before Wimbledon, and I wasn't even trying to win the match. I just wanted off the court. I was 29 years old and I thought, if I'm doing that, what am I even doing playing tennis? It was quite emotional." However the fear that he hadn't done himself justice stopped him quitting.

At Wimbledon, he made it into the third round for only the second time, whilst partnering Jamie Delgado in their fifth event of the year. They lost in straight sets to the second seeds and eventual winners, Daniel Nestor and Nenad Zimonjić 5–7, 4–6, 4–6. This thrust him back into the top 200 of the world's doubles rankings, setting off a period of improved form. Following Wimbledon, Marray's increased ranking allowed him to become a regular on the ATP Challenger Tour, winning two titles with Jamie Murray and one with Joshua Goodall. He finished the season in the top 100 for the first time.

2010-2011
Marray had partnered Jamie Murray sporadically, but now played regularly with him for the first 7 months of 2010. Thereafter Marray embarked on a steady partnership with Jamie Delgado until January 2012.

Through 2010 and 2011, Marray continued to have some success on the Challenger circuit, competing in 14 finals and winning 7. His most successful Grand Slam appearance was at the 2011 US Open with Delgado. They made it into the third round but lost to sixth seeds and tournament runners up Mariusz Fyrstenberg and Marcin Matkowski in three sets 7–6(7–5), 2–6, 3–6. He finished the season ranked 86th in the world.

2012: Wimbledon Men's Doubles Champion
Marray partnered Jamie Delgado at the Australian Open and Dustin Brown at the French Open, but lost both in the first round. He also reached seven Challenger tour finals, winning two in Bosnia and Italy with Dustin Brown.

Marray had been friends with Frederik Nielsen since their early days on the senior tour, but had only played together twice before in 2006 and 2008. However, during 2012, he began partnering Frederik Nielsen, reaching the final of the 2012 Aegon Trophy, but lost to fellow Brit Dominic Inglot and Treat Conrad Huey of the Philippines, in three sets 4–6, 7–6(11–9), 8–10.

At Wimbledon, Marray and partner Frederik Nielsen were granted a wildcard. Marray was supposed to compete with Adil Shamasdin, but they did not get their paperwork in time. Before they reached the finals, they defeated two seeded teams, in addition to the defending champions Bob and Mike Bryan in the semi-final, over four sets 6–4, 7–6(11–9), 6–7(4–7), 7–6(7–5). By getting into the final, Marray became the first British man to get to a Wimbledon men's doubles final since 1960. In the final, they faced fifth seeds Robert Lindstedt and Horia Tecău. At one set all, during the third set tie break, Marray called a fault on himself after the umpire did not see that he had inadvertently touched the net while hitting a volley, which earned him praise for his sportsmanship and honesty. Despite this, Marray and Nielsen went on to win in five sets 4–6, 6–4, 7–6(7–5), 6–7(5–7), 6–3.

Marray became the first British player to win the Wimbledon men's doubles final since 1936, he thus became the first British person to win any Wimbledon Championship title since Jamie Murray in 2007; Marray and Nielsen became the first players to get to the final and to win the men's doubles on a wildcard at Wimbledon. This also raised his doubles ranking to a career-high no. 21 in the world. This was the first time Marray broke into the top 50 in the rankings, making him Britain's No. 1.

Marray credited sport psychologist, Richard De Souza, for helping him win Wimbledon. Saying that Richard “has been the biggest help to my tennis this year. A lot of my performances this week have to be put down to the work I have done with him.”

In spite of their Wimbledon victory, Nielsen declared that he liked playing singles, and wouldn't be playing doubles full-time.

Following his win, Marray received direct entry to higher level Masters tournaments for the first time. He initially struggled, however, playing with seven different partners and winning just two of thirteen matches in his eleven tournaments after Wimbledon. At the US Open Marray partnered again with Nielsen and were ranked as the eleventh seeds. They were beaten in the second round by Jesse Levine and Marinko Matosevic in three sets 1–6, 7–6(8–6), 4–6. Marray also competed in the Mixed doubles event but lost in the first round to Abigail Spears and Scott Lipsky in straight sets 1–6, 3–6. He partnered Vladimíra Uhlířová.

At the Paris Masters, Marray had his most successful run at a masters 1000 and since Wimbledon, reaching the semi-finals with Paul Hanley. On their way to the semi-finals they beat top seeds the Bryan Brothers in three sets. They eventually lost to fifth seeds and eventual winners Mahesh Bhupathi and Rohan Bopanna in straight sets. This put Marray into the top 20 for the first time in his career. Following straight on from Paris, he and Nielsen competed at the ATP World Tour Finals, for which they qualified thanks to winning at Wimbledon. The pair won their opening two matches of the group but lost their final match, however they qualified out of the robin round. They were eliminated in the semi-finals to eventual winners Marcel Granollers and Marc López in straight sets 4–6, 3–6. Marray ended the year ranked No. 17 in the world, a career high that made him the Britain's No. 1 doubles player.

In December, the Lawn Tennis Association announced that Marray was one of 21 players set to receive the LTA's highest level of funding next season, which is supported through Team Aegon.

2013
Marray began 2013 partnering Dustin Brown, reaching the semi-finals of the Qatar Open before being defeated by Filip Polášek and Julian Knowle in three sets. At the Australian Open, Marray was seeded for the first time at a Grand Slam, partnering Brazilian player André Sá, and seeded 16th. They reached the second round, where they were defeated by Dutch pair Robin Haase and Igor Sijsling in straight sets. On 28 January he achieved his highest ranking, reaching number 15 in the world, no English born doubles player has ever been ranked higher (doubles rankings being introduced in 1976)

Marray later teamed up with fellow Brit Colin Fleming for several events, including a semifinal appearance at the Open Sud de France, where they were the top seeds.

After the pair were knocked out in the first round of the Miami Masters, Marray and Fleming headed to Coventry, UK to play in the doubles rubber of Great Britain's Davis Cup tie with Russia. Marray was making his Davis Cup debut at 32.
After the Great Britain team had lost the first two singles rubbers, the pair won against Victor Baluda and Igor Kunitsyn 6–1, 6–4, 6–2 in only an hour and a half to keep the tie alive.
A day later James Ward levelled the tie at 2–2 after beating Tursunov in five sets. Dan Evans then defeated world no. 80 Evgeny Donskoy comprehensively in straight sets, thus securing what was described as a "famous victory". The last time Great Britain had come from 2–0 down to win a Davis Cup tie was 83 years ago against Germany, Consequently, Great Britain won a place in the 16-team World Group play-offs in September.

Continuing his partnership with Fleming, Marray reached his second career ATP final, at the 2013 Aegon International. En route to the final, the pair defeated Marray's former partner Frederik Nielsen, with whom he had won the Wimbledon doubles title the previous year. In the final the pair faced the duo of Austrian Alexander Peya and Bruno Soares of Brazil. Despite a strong start in which they took the first set, the pair couldn't maintain their intensity and ultimately lost in three sets, a trio of double faults from Marray in the 8th game of the second set proving to be fatal.

Marray entered Wimbledon as defending champion, but despite his previous success with Frederik Nielsen, the two decided not to play together, Marray instead was partnered by Colin Fleming. The two made it to the third round, but they couldn't replicate the form that saw Marray clinch the title during the previous season, going out in straight sets to Daniel Nestor, and Robert Lindstedt, against whom Marray won the title the previous year. Failure to defend his title meant that Marray plummeted 19 places in the ATP rankings to no. 34, making him the second ranked British player behind Fleming.

Following on from Wimbledon, Marray remained in his partnership with Fleming, and going into the American hardcourt season, the pair made their second final of the year at the BB&T Atlanta Open, Marray's first on hard courts. Here they faced French-Dutch duo of Edouard Roger-Vasselin and Igor Sijsling, however despite a close opening set, the Brits were ultimately defeated in straight sets. Marray had to miss both Montreal and Cincinnati due to injury, and so the pair played their next tournament at the US Open. Marray reached only the second Grand Slam quarterfinal of his career, defeating Indian/French duo of Rohan Bopanna and Édouard Roger-Vasselin before falling to Bob and Mike Bryan in a close straight sets encounter.

For the Davis Cup World Group play-off against Croatia in Umag on clay, Andy Murray, Dan Evans, James Ward and Colin Fleming were initially announced as the Great Britain team. However captain Leon Smith, called up Marray and Kyle Edmund, with Marray replacing James Ward, to give the team more doubles options, and Kyle Edmund acting as a hitting partner. In the event, Andy Murray, playing in his first Davis Cup tie for two years, won both his singles matches and the doubles with Colin Fleming to beat Croatia 4–1, and return Great Britain to the World Group for the first time since 2008.

During the Asian swing of tournaments, Marray continued to partner Fleming, however the pair only managed two second round appearances, at the China Open and the Shanghai Masters respectively. After the pair lost in the first round of the Swiss Indoors, Marray parted ways with Fleming, playing his final tournament of the year with Igor Sijsling, however once again losing his opening match. Marray ended the year ranked number 41 in the world, having lost a considerable number of points from failing to qualify for the ATP World Tour Finals.

In November, the Lawn Tennis Association announced a dramatic cut in elite player funding, with all financial support being withdrawn from Britain's doubles specialists and any singles players aged over 24, to reduce the number of supported players from 16 this year to just six in 2014.

2014
Marray struggled for full fitness and finding a regular doubles partner, travelling to tournaments with no plan whatsoever.
He jetted out to Indian Wells in March, unable to convince anyone to join him on court, until Wimbledon's reigning men's singles champion Andy Murray offered to play with him. 
After fans queued around the grounds to watch Roger Federer and Stanislas Wawrinka play together, it was standing room only for Murray and Marray's first competitive match together. Andy Murray and Jonny Marray won a thrilling doubles clash against Gaël Monfils and Juan Mónaco, 6–4 4–6 11–9, only to lose in the second round 7–6 (7–1), 6–3 to the No 2 seeds Alexander Peya and Bruno Soares.

Following this, Marray was then out for two months with a torn calf.
At Wimbledon, playing with Australian John-Patrick Smith for the first time, they won their first round match 6–4 5–7 6–4 over Andreas Siljeström and Igor Zelenay, before losing their next match against 15th seeds Juan Sebastian Cabal and Marcin Matkowski.

In September, Ross Hutchins decided to quit the Tour, soon after his return following treatment for Hodgkin's Lymphoma.
That prompted his partner Colin Fleming to team up with Jonny Marray.

Their first tournament together was the ATP Challenger in Istanbul.  Their combined ranking points meant they were top seeds, making it all the way to the final and winning 6–4, 2–6, 10–8.
Marray and Fleming moved onto the main ATP tour event in Metz, however, as their combined ranking was not quite high enough for direct entry, they temporarily split. Marray paired up with Jamie Murray, Fleming partnered Michael Venus of New Zealand.

2015
In January, Marray and Yen-Hsun Lu claimed an impressive 6–3 7–6 (7/4) win over top seeds Raven Klassen and home favourite Leander Paes in the Chennai final in India. It was Marray's first ATP-level title since his famous surprise victory with Freddie Nielsen in SW19 back in 2012.

In February, Marray and Fleming were narrowly beaten in the doubles final at the Open 13 in Marseille. Looking for their first title together in their third final, Fleming and Marray went down 6–4 3–6 10–8 to Croatia's Marin Draganja and Henri Kontinen of Finland despite winning four more points.

Having failed to get the results they wanted, Fleming decided to split from Jonny Marray. Fleming said breaking the news to Marray, a good friend, had been hard.

In July, Marray won the ATP 250 event in Newport, Rhode Island alongside Pakistani player Aisam Qureshi. The win put Marray back into the world's top 50.

2016

Aisam-Ul-Haq Qureshi, ranked 37, announced that during the 2016 season he would partner Marray ranked 53, but after three first round defeats, which included the Australian Open, they parted. Marray partnered Mahesh Bhupathi and Rameez Junaid several times with occasional runs to the semi and quarter of Challengers and Tour events.

In April, Marray started a more successful regular partnership with Canadian Adil Shamasdin, reaching the semifinals of the Aegon Surbiton Trophy.

At Wimbledon, Marray/Shamasdin beat last year's champions Jean-Julien Rojer and Horia Tecău in the first round and progressed to the quarterfinals. This was the first time Marray had reached this stage at a Grand Slam since his Championship win in 2012.

Two weeks later, Marray/Shamasdin reached the finals at the Hall of Fame Championships in Rhode Island.

2017: Final year and retirement 

In February 2017 season Marray played his final tournaments and retired one month before his 36th birthday, having played professionally for 17 years. His last tournaments were the ATP250 event at the Open Sud De France, then the Challenger La Manche.

Significant finals

Grand Slam finals

Doubles: 1 (1 title)

ATP career finals

Doubles: 8 (3 titles, 5 runners-up)

ATP Challenger career finals

Singles: 1 (0–1)

Doubles: 36 (19–17)

Doubles performance timeline

Current till 2017 Open Sud de France.

References

External links
 
 
 

1981 births
Living people
English male tennis players
Sportspeople from Liverpool
Tennis people from Greater London
Wimbledon champions
Grand Slam (tennis) champions in men's doubles
Sportspeople from Sheffield
British male tennis players
Tennis people from Merseyside
People educated at All Saints Catholic High School, Sheffield